Gentlemen, I Neglected to Inform You You Will Not Be Getting Paid is a 2009 album by jazz guitarist Charlie Hunter.

Recorded "In Glorious Mono" on analog tape with no overdubs, the album marks a shift in Hunter's sound from the genre-mixing of his previous three releases to a consistent blues/R&B-influenced approach. The title is allegedly a real quotation; according to Hunter,

Well, it's a quote from a real, older, curmudgeonly musician that people have worked for. And I cannot name names, but it really did happen. It really does happen; let me put it that way.

Track listing
All songs written by Charlie Hunter.

"You Look Good in Orange" – 4:43
"Antoine" – 3:13
"High and Dry" – 4:20
"Tout Ce Qui Brille Ne Pas Or" – 5:08
"High Pockets and a Fanny Pack" – 4:02
"Drop a Dime" – 4:37
"Ode to My Honda Odyssey" – 4:01
"Every Day You Wake Up New York Says No" – 4:26
"Gentlemen, I Neglected to Inform You You Will Not Be Getting Paid" – 3:11

Personnel 
 Charlie Hunter – seven-string guitar
 Eric Kalb – drums
 Curtis Fowlkes – trombone
 Alan Ferber – trombone
 Eric Biondo – trumpet

Production
 Charlie Hunter – producer
 Dave McNair – producer

References

2009 albums
Charlie Hunter albums
Blues albums by American artists